The 2015 Internationaux de Tennis de Vendée was a professional tennis tournament played on hard courts. It was the third edition of the tournament which was part of the 2015 ATP Challenger Tour. It took place in Mouilleron-le-Captif, France between 9 and 15 November 2015.

Singles main-draw entrants

Seeds

 1 Rankings are as of November 2, 2015.

Other entrants
The following players received wildcards into the singles main draw:
  Maxime Janvier
  Tom Jomby
  Adrian Mannarino
  Benoît Paire

The following player entered the main draw as a protected ranking:
  Marco Chiudinelli

The following players received entry from the qualifying draw:
  Jesse Huta Galung 
  Yannik Reuter
  Laurent Rochette
  Gleb Sakharov

Champions

Singles

 Benoît Paire def.  Lucas Pouille 6–4, 1–6, 7–6(9–7)

Doubles

 Sander Arends /  Adam Majchrowicz def.  Aliaksandr Bury /  Andreas Siljeström 6–3, 5–7, [10–8]

External links
Official Website

2015 ATP Challenger Tour
2015